The Gunung Berau Nature Reserve is found in Indonesia. This site is 1100 km2.

References

Protected areas of Indonesia
Borneo